Yan Ge (born 28 January 1994) is a Chinese footballer currently playing as a midfielder for Hefei City.

Career statistics

Club
.

Notes

References

1994 births
Living people
Chinese footballers
Association football midfielders
China League Two players
China League One players
Shanghai Shenhua F.C. players
Inner Mongolia Caoshangfei F.C. players
Jiangxi Beidamen F.C. players